Alain Roy (born 7 May 1951) is a French bobsledder. He competed at the 1972 Winter Olympics and the 1976 Winter Olympics.

References

1951 births
Living people
French male bobsledders
Olympic bobsledders of France
Bobsledders at the 1972 Winter Olympics
Bobsledders at the 1976 Winter Olympics
Place of birth missing (living people)